Sex is the fourth studio album by Greek artist, Elli Kokkinou. It was released on 3 November 2005 by Heaven Music and certified gold certification, selling 20,000 units. The album was written by Phoebus, with remaining lyrics by Natalia Germanou and Giannis Rentoumis.

Track listing

Singles 
The following singles were officially released to radio stations and made into music videos, except the song "Erotas Einai", and gained a lot of airplay.

 "Sex"
 "Talento" (Talent)
 "Ti Tis Eheis Vrei" (What Have You Found In Her)
 "Itan Psema" (It Was A Lie)
 "Erotas Einai" (Love Is)

Credits 
Credits adapted from liner notes.

Personnel 

 Giannis Bithikotsis – bouzouki, cura (tracks: 2, 3, 6, 8, 10) / baglama (tracks: 2, 3, 6, 8)
 Giorgos Chatzopoulos – guitars (tracks: 1, 5, 6, 7, 8, 11)
 Victoria Chalkiti – backing vocals (tracks: 1, 2, 5, 7, 9)
 Achilleas Diamantis – guitars (tracks: 1, 5)
 Akis Diximos – backing vocals (tracks: 1) / second vocal (tracks: 1, 2, 3, 6, 7, 8, 10, 11)
 Nektarios Georgiadis – backing vocals (tracks: 5, 7)
 Antonis Gounaris – guitars (tracks: 2, 3, 6, 9, 10, 11) / cura (tracks: 7)
 Trifon Koutsourelis – orchestration, programming, keyboards (tracks: 1, 2, 3, 5, 6, 7, 8, 9, 10, 11)
 Fedon Lionoudakis – accordion (tracks: 2, 6, 10)
 Alex Panagi – backing vocals (tracks: 1, 2, 5, 7, 9) / second vocal (tracks: 5)
 Liana Papalexi – backing vocals (tracks: 9)
 Phoebus – orchestration (all tracks) / programming, keyboards (tracks: 4)
 Giorgos Roilos – percussion (tracks: 6, 7)
 Filippos Tseberoulis – flute (tracks: 3, 10, 11)

Production 

 Manolis Chiotis – studio photographer
 Giannis Ioannidis (Digital Press Hellas) – mastering
 Konstantinos Kagkas – hair styling
 Giorgos Klaromenos – imagine director
 Vanesa Koutsopodiotou – make up
 Vasilis Nikolopoulos – sound engineer, mix engineer
 Phoebus – executive producer
 Panos Pitsilidis – art direction
 Thodoris Psiachos – cover photographer
 Vaggelis Siapatis – computer editing, sound engineer
 Giorgos Stabolis – production manager
 Aspasia Tsousi – layout
 Manolis Vlachos – mix engineer
 Alexis Valourdos – imagine director

Charts 
Sex made its debut at number 2 on the 'Top 50 Greek Albums' charts by IFPI.

In a month, it was certified gold according to sales.

Ki Allo... Platinum Edition

Ki Allo... Platinum Edition (Greek: Κι Άλλο...; English: More...) is the re-release of fourth studio album Sex by Greek artist, Elli Kokkinou. It was released on 22 November 2006 by Heaven Music and received platinum certification, selling other 20,000 units. Following recent tactics, the album was re-released with four new songs, in one of them featuring Thanos Petrelis. It also includes a DVD with music videos, photos, and interviews.

Track listing

DVD
DVD contains the video clips of following songs:
"Sex"
"Ti Tis Eheis Vrei"
"Itan Psema"
"Making Of" photos
Gold status of Sex
"Sex" (French version) from Mad Video Awards 2006
Interview with Makis Pounentis

Singles 
The following singles were officially released to radio stations and made into music videos and had good airplay.

 "Sex [French version]"
 "Ki Allo" (More)
 "Adiaforos" (Uninterested)

Credits 
Credits adapted from liner notes.

Personnel 

 Hakan Bingolou – oud, säz (tracks: 4)
 Giannis Bithikotsis – bouzouki (tracks: 1, 3) / cura (tracks: 1) / baglama (tracks: 1, 3) / lute (tracks: 2)
 Victoria Chalkiti – backing vocals (tracks: 1)
 Giorgos Chatzopoulos – guitars (tracks: 1, 2, 3)
 Akis Diximos – backing vocals, second vocal (tracks: 2, 3)
 Trifon Koutsourelis – orchestration, programming, keyboards (tracks: 1, 2, 3)
 Alex Panagi – backing vocals (tracks: 1)
 Phoebus – orchestration (all tracks) / programming, keyboards (tracks: 4)
 Giorgos Roilos – percussion (tracks: 1, 2, 3)
 Thanasis Vasilopoulos – clarinet, ney (tracks: 4)

Production 

 Antonis Aspromourgos – processing
 Manolis Chiotis – studio photographer
 Konstantinos Kagkas – hair styling
 Giorgos Klaromenos – imagine director
 Vanesa Koutsopodiotou – make up
 Vasilis Nikolopoulos – sound engineer, mix engineer
 Elsa Patsadeli – styling
 Phoebus – executive producer
 Panos Pitsilidis – art direction
 Roula Revi – cover photographer
 Vaggelis Siapatis – computer editing, sound engineer
 Giorgos Stabolis – production manager
 Aspasia Tsousi – layout
 Alexis Valourdos – imagine director
 Leon Zervos – mastering

Charts 
Ki Allo... Platinum Edition made its debut at number 1 on the 'Top 50 Greek Albums' charts by IFPI.

With its release, it was certified platinum according to sales.

References 

2006 albums
Albums produced by Phoebus (songwriter)
Elli Kokkinou albums
Greek-language albums
Heaven Music albums
2005 albums